Gold(III) hydroxide, gold trihydroxide, or gold hydroxide is an inorganic compound, a hydroxide of gold, with formula Au(OH)3. It is also called auric acid with formula H3AuO3. It is easily dehydrated above 140 °C to gold(III) oxide. Salts of auric acid are termed aurates.

Gold hydroxide is used in medicine, porcelain making, gold plating, and daguerrotypes. Gold hydroxide deposited on suitable carriers can be used for preparation of gold catalysts.

Gold hydroxide is a product of electrochemical corrosion of gold metalization subjected to moisture and positive electric potential; it is one of the corrosion failure modes of microelectronics. Voluminous gold hydroxide is produced from gold metalization; after the layer grows thick it may spall, and the conductive particles may cause short circuits or leakage paths. The decreased thickness of the gold layer may also lead to an increase in its electrical resistance, which can also lead to electrical failure.

Preparation and reactions
Gold(III) hydroxide is produced by the reaction of chloroauric acid with an alkali, such as sodium hydroxide:
HAuCl4 + 4NaOH → Au(OH)3 + 4NaCl + H2O

Gold(III) hydroxide reacts with ammonia to produce fulminating gold, an explosive compound.

It also reacts with an alkali to produce aurates(AuO2-).

References

Gold(III) compounds
Hydroxides